Amir Ganiel (January 6, 1963 in Jerusalem – May 14, 2018) was an Israeli swimming champion.

Biography
Ganiel's son, Imri Ganiel, is also a swimmer. He is a national record holder and an Olympic swimmer of Israel.

Sports career
Ganiel was a record holder who participated in the World Championships in Berlin for the national team. He specialized in long distance. He was recognized as one of Israel's greatest swimmers. He achieved 11 Israeli records.

Medical career
After his retirement from competitive swimming, Ganiel studied medicine at Ben-Gurion University of the Negev. He became a chest and heart surgeon at the Soroka University Medical Center.

See also
Sports in Israel
Health care in Israel

References

1963 births
2018 deaths
Israeli male swimmers
Sportspeople from Jerusalem
Israeli thoracic surgeons
Ben-Gurion University of the Negev alumni